Musaed Abdullah is a Kuwaiti retired footballer who played in centre back for Kuwaiti Premier League club Al Naser.

He played for Al-Arabi in the 2007 AFC Champions League group stage.

References

Living people
1981 births
Kuwaiti footballers
Al-Sulaibikhat SC players
Sportspeople from Kuwait City
Association football defenders
Kuwait international footballers
Al-Arabi SC (Kuwait) players
Al-Nasr SC (Kuwait) players
Kuwait Premier League players